The BBC Radio 2 Electric Proms (formerly the BBC Electric Proms) was an October music festival in London run by the BBC for five years, 2006–2010. On 31 January 2011, the BBC announced that the event would be discontinued with immediate effect due to financial cutbacks.

The name was taken from The Proms, a classical music festival running since 1895, and borrowed a few traditions from its counterpart such as the final night culminating in an interpretation of "Land of Hope and Glory". The musical performances at the festival typically involved indie rock bands incorporating instruments outside of their usual arrangement, most commonly in the form of collaborations with the BBC Concert Orchestra.

Primarily the festival's headline acts played at The Roundhouse in Camden but events, which included a programme of film, were not limited to this venue. For example, acoustic events took place at Cecil Sharp House. In 2008 in acknowledgement of its status as European Capital of Culture, events were staged in both Liverpool and London.

In Australia, this program started airing on ABC2 from 1 May 2009 with episodes in a scattered order.

2010 line-up 
The 2010 event (now rebranded as the BBC Radio 2 Electric Proms) took place solely in The Roundhouse and ran from Thursday 28 October to Saturday 30 October. The entire event catered to the Radio 2 audience, whereas previously the Electric Proms events featured the involvement of all four of the BBC's national popular music stations.

There were three acts, which were announced by Chris Evans on BBC Radio 2.

28 October 
Elton John (collaborators – Leon Russell, Plan B, Rumer)

29 October 
Robert Plant (collaborators – Band of Joy, London Oriana Choir)

30 October 
Neil Diamond with Lulu and Amy MacDonald

2009 line-up 
The 2009 event took place solely in The Roundhouse and ran from Tuesday 20 October to Saturday 24 October.

20 October
Robbie Williams (Musical Director – Trevor Horn)

21 October 
Dizzee Rascal with The Young Punx and the Heritage Orchestra. (Musical Director – Hal Ritson)

BBC Radio 1Xtra After Party (Studio Theatre)

22 October 
London:Doves with the London Bulgarian Choir and arrangements by Avshalom Caspi; Magazine

Manchester: Florence + the Machine; Metronomy

23 October 
Shirley Bassey with the BBC Concert Orchestra; Richard Hawley

24 October 
Roundhouse: Smokey Robinson and his band with the BBC Concert Orchestra

2008 line-up

22 October 
London: Burt Bacharach with the BBC Concert Orchestra; XX Teens; Wild Beasts; Africa Express; Goldfrapp

Liverpool: Tony Christie

23 October 
London: The Streets; Santogold; Keane; Maddy Prior

Liverpool: BBC Merseyside Peel Night – Milanese; Rolo Tomassi; 2 Hot 2 Sweat

24 October 
London: Nitin Sawhney and the London Undersound Orchestra

Liverpool: The Last Shadow Puppets; Stephen Fretwell; BBC Merseyside event with Steve Lamacq

25 October 
London: Saturday Night Fever curated by Robin Gibb, with special guests Ronan Keating, Stephen Gately, Sam Sparro, Sharleen Spiteri, Gabriella Cilmi and Bryn Christopher; Justice, Coldcut via The Radiophonic Workshop; Red Light Company; Fox Cubs; Micachu

Liverpool: Razorlight; Kitty Daisy and Lewis; Thomas Tantrum; Esser

26 October 
London: Oasis with the Crouch End Festival Chorus; Glasvegas; Lowkey; BBC Introducing – Pete and the Pirates; General Fiasco; Pull in Emergency; Chew Lips

Liverpool: Wave Machines; The Maybes?; Candie and Howard; Elliott Payne

2007 line-up

24 October 
Mark Ronson and the BBC Concert Orchestra (with guests Daniel Merriweather, Charlie Waller, Candie Payne, Wale, Ricky Wilson, Sean Lennon and others); The Coral; Editors; Blanche; Charlie Louvin; Sigur Rós; Siouxsie Sioux; Agaskodo Teliverek; Daft Punk's Electroma; The Beatles' Help!; Radio Luxembourg

25 October 
Paul McCartney; Soil & "Pimp" Sessions with Jamie Cullum; Hadouken!; The Enemy; The Chemical Brothers; Justice; Tribute to Lal Waterson

26 October 
Kaiser Chiefs via David Arnold; Reverend and The Makers; New Cassettes; Cold War Kids; The Metros; Daler Mehndi and The Wolfmen; Bishi; Basquiat Strings with Seb Rochford, Ellery Eskelin and Simon H Fell

27 October 
Bloc Party in The Roundhouse Main Space; Kano Presents London Town; Ghetto; Maps

28 October 
Ray Davies and Friends; Duke Special; Ben Westbeech; Estelle; The Flaming Lips; Sam Isaac

2006 line-up 
Paul Weller with Amy Winehouse and others; Guillemots; Kasabian; The Magic Numbers; Jamiroquai; The Young Knives; Klaxons; The Good, the Bad & the Queen; James Brown with the Sugababes, Max Beesley and the London Community Gospel Choir; Jamie T; The Raconteurs; The Horrors; The View; The Zutons; Jet; The Who; Spencer McGarry Season; Friends of the Bride; Genod Droog. Vashti Bunyan. Donovan both on the same set.

See also 

The Proms
List of music festivals in the United Kingdom

References

External links 

Music festivals in London
Annual events in London
Recurring events established in 2006
Music festivals in Merseyside
Electric Proms
Recurring events disestablished in 2011
2006 establishments in England
 Radio 2 Electric Proms
2000s in London